Lake Kiowa is a census-designated place (CDP) in Cooke County, Texas, United States, the majority of which consists of the gated community of the same name.

The population was 1,906 at the 2010 census.

Geography
Lake Kiowa is a private residential community located in southeastern Cooke County at  (33.566497, -97.007479), around the lake of the same name. The lake is an impoundment on Indian Creek, part of the Trinity River watershed.

Demographics

2020 census

As of the 2020 United States census, there were 2,254 people, 1,070 households, and 839 families residing in the CDP.

2000 census
As of the census of 2000, there were 1,883 people, 861 households, and 661 families residing in the CDP. The population density was 628.1 people per square mile (242.3/km2). There were 1,064 housing units at an average density of 354.9/sq mi (136.9/km2). The racial makeup of the CDP was 97.45% White, 0.11% African American, 0.53% Native American, 0.37% Asian, 0.48% from other races, and 1.06% from two or more races. Hispanic or Latino of any race were 1.75% of the population.

There were 861 households, out of which 14.4% had children under the age of 18 living with them, 72.7% were married couples living together, 2.7% had a female householder with no husband present, and 23.2% were non-families. 21.0% of all households were made up of individuals, and 14.2% had someone living alone who was 65 years of age or older. The average household size was 2.19 and the average family size was 2.49.

In the CDP, the population was spread out, with 13.6% under the age of 18, 2.6% from 18 to 24, 14.0% from 25 to 44, 35.4% from 45 to 64, and 34.4% who were 65 years of age or older. The median age was 59 years. For every 100 females, there were 93.1 males. For every 100 females age 18 and over, there were 92.3 males.

The median income for a household in the CDP was $55,430, and the median income for a family was $66,250. Males had a median income of $44,531 versus $27,750 for females. The per capita income for the CDP was $28,354. About 1.7% of families and 5.4% of the population were below the poverty line, including 10.4% of those under age 18 and 1.5% of those age 65 or over.

Community government and amenities
Lake Kiowa is governed by the Lake Kiowa Property Owners Association, which is owned by the property owners themselves as the community is almost totally built out (all lots previously owned by the developers were sold as of 2017; the only vacant lots remaining are owned by private individuals).

The Association is led by a nine-member elected board of directors, with each director serving a 3-year term.  The terms are offset with three directors up for election each year.  The Association maintains the community's amenities as well as its roads (the community's main road, Kiowa Drive, loops around the lake and crosses over its dam).

The Association provides private security, limited to writing speeding/parking tickets and enforcing community rules.  Police protection is provided by the Cooke County Sheriff's Department and, to a lesser extent, the nearby Gainesville Police Department.  Fire and emergency services are provided by the Indian Creek Volunteer Fire Department which serves Lake Kiowa and the surrounding area.

The Lake Kiowa Special Utility District maintains the water supply.  Trash pickup is provided by the Association through a private contractor (recycling is no longer offered as of 2018 outside of aluminum can donation sites for the local Kiwanis Club).  Sewer service is not available; homes must install and maintain an operable septic system.

The Callisburg Independent School District serves students residing in Lake Kiowa.

Amenities
The Association owns the amenities offered by the community, which are centered around its namesake lake (a private  lake).  The lake is large enough for skiing, tubing, and other controlled boating activities, though wake boats must disable their ballast system to prevent damage to private boat docks and sea walls.  Fishing is permitted and abundant fish reside in the lake; the Lake Kiowa Anglers and Conservation Club maintains the small and large fishing areas provided.

In addition, the Association also operates a private 18-hole golf course. Two different beach areas offer swimming, volleyball, tennis, and other opportunities. Each beach has picnic areas and a large pavilion is located at the Lodge (the community clubhouse and restaurant/bar). A 9-hole disc golf course is also available.

References

External links
 Lake Kiowa Property Owners Association
 Lake Kiowa Real Estate

Census-designated places in Cooke County, Texas
Gated communities in Texas